Charkha is one of 11 villages in Dhari Taluka and one of 616 in the Amreli district of the Saurashtra peninsula in the Indian state of Gujarat.[1]

Charkha is formerly a princely state, (feudatory state or Indian state) under an indigenous ruler in a subsidiary alliance with the British Raj. It was indirectly ruled by the British during colonial times.

Climate 
The climate of Charkha falls within that of the sub-tropical Amreli district, which is characterized by three well-defined seasons: summer (April to June), monsoon (July to September), and winter (October to March).

The 2012 Central Ground Water Board (CGWB) report records the area's mean maximum daily temperature range as 28 °C (82.4 °F) to 40 °C (104 °F). The mean minimum daily temperature ranges from 11 °C (51.8 °F) to 26 °C (78.8 °F). The relative humidity ranges from 81% during monsoon season to 40% during winter. Mean wind speed ranges from 188 km/d during winter to more than 500 km/d during summer and monsoon. Potential Evaporate Transpiration (PET) is at its peak during summer months. It ranges from 4.6 mm/d during December to 10.5 mm/d during May. The average monthly PET is about 6.4 mm/d. And the monthly average rainfall in 2011 was 689 mm.

History 
During the British Raj, Charkha was a village under Lakhapadar thana. Charkha was ruled by Kathi chieftains of the Vala tribe. One of them was H. H. Namdar Maharaj Lakhuwala Punjawala. His son, Namdar Sree Mangluwala Lakhuwala lived near the Dhari village. In 1901, Charkha and a second village, with a combined population of 40,000 generated 1,27,000 rupees in state revenue (1903–4, nearly all from land), paying a 541 rupees tribute, to the Gaikwar Baroda State and Junagadh State.

Demographics 
According to the 1881 and 1872 censuses, the population of Charkha decreased from 1,613 to 1,414. Charkha village has a population of 677 people in about 179 houses, according to Census 2011.

References

External links and sources 
 Imperial Gazetteer, on dsal.uchicago.edu

Villages in Amreli district
Princely states of Gujarat